Gürzallar is a village and municipality in the Goranboy District of Azerbaijan.

References

External links 

Populated places in Goranboy District